The Nassawango Iron Furnace was built in 1830 by the Maryland Iron Company to produce iron from bog ore deposits in its vicinity.  It is notable for its innovative use of a "hot blast" technique for smelting the iron, which had been developed in England around 1828, and which may have been added to the Nassawango Furnace in 1837. Due to the variable nature of the bog ore deposits, the furnace stopped operations in 1849.

The furnace is now centerpiece of the Furnace Town Living Heritage Museum.

References

External links
, including undated, at Maryland Historical Trust

Industrial buildings and structures on the National Register of Historic Places in Maryland
Buildings and structures in Worcester County, Maryland
Historic American Engineering Record in Maryland
Ironworks and steel mills in Maryland
National Register of Historic Places in Worcester County, Maryland
1830 establishments in Maryland